Robert Brewster (17 August 1867 – 8 November 1962) was an Australian cricketer. He played one first-class match for New South Wales in 1893/94.

See also
 List of New South Wales representative cricketers

References

External links
 

1867 births
1962 deaths
Australian cricketers
New South Wales cricketers
Cricketers from Sydney